Arab Woman is a watercolor painting by American artist John Singer Sargent, created c. 1905-1906. It is in the collection of the Metropolitan Museum of Art, in New York.

Description
Prominent American painter John Singer Sargent took two notable trips to the Middle East during his lifetime; the first trip was to Greece, Egypt, and Turkey in 1890, while the second was to the-then Ottoman provinces of Syria and Palestine in 1905. These trips spurred Sargent to create a number of works of art concerning various subjects.

Arab Woman was produced by Sargent during his one of his travels in the Middle East. The image, done in watercolor and gouache on woven white paper, depicts a veiled Muslim woman wearing a white niqāb. According to an inscription left by Sargent on the painting, the work is incomplete.

References

1900s paintings
Paintings in the collection of the Metropolitan Museum of Art
Watercolor paintings
Paintings by John Singer Sargent
Portraits of women